Paul Wartel (26 April 1903 – 27 April 1976) was a French football defender who, between 1926 and 1933, played for Red Star and FC Sochaux-Montbéliard and, between 1933 and 1960, managed and coached five teams.

At the end of his playing career, Paul Wartel, a native of the Paris suburb of Puteaux, spent most of the following twenty-seven years as a team manager and/or coach with Sochaux-Montbéliard and four other teams, US Servannaise et Malouine, EF Nancy-Lorraine, Olympique de Marseille and Besançon RC.

References

External links
 Paul Wartel profile at om1899 website, spotlighting trainers active during 1945–46
 Paul Wartel profile at the official site of FC Sochaux-Montbéliard

1903 births
1976 deaths
People from Puteaux
Footballers from Hauts-de-Seine
Association football defenders
French footballers
Red Star F.C. players
FC Sochaux-Montbéliard players
Ligue 1 players
French football managers
FC Sochaux-Montbéliard managers
Racing Besançon managers
Olympique de Marseille managers